(Christmas Pastoral) is a trio composition for flute, bassoon and harp written by André Jolivet in 1943. It is cast in four movements and lasts about 12 minutes.

It has been described as an "unusual and very lovely Christmas piece".

Overview
The work, for the most part gentle and evocative, establishes a mood of antiquity. The four scenes are vividly characterized and the instruments are used to great effect.

The opening movement, " (The Star) begins with a mysterious duet for flute and bassoon and features sparkling harp arpeggios. In "", the bassoon and the flute echo the Magis' efforts during their journey, with a melody that displays a characteristic augmented interval (E-flat to F-sharp). The goal of their pilgrimage is the subject of the next movement, "". It is extremely simple, based entirely on the C minor scale. The harmony consists only of three chords: C minor, F minor and G minor and calls to mind a peaceful lullaby. The final movement, "" (Entrance and Dance of the Shepherds) is more rhythmically complex and changes metre several times. It ends unexpectedly on an E major chord with added sixth.

Movements
 L'Étoile
 Les Mages
 La Vierge et l'enfant
 Entrée et danse des bergers

Selected discography
Castagner, Faisandier, Laskine, 2005, Recorded in 1956, Accord 2CD 4767783.
Trio Nordmann, 1972, Erato STU-70-706.
The Britten–Pears Ensemble, 1995, ASV CD DCA-918.
 Manuela Wiesler, Christian Davidsson, Erica Goodman, 1996, Bis Records CD 739.
Ensemble Arpeggio, 2004, ASV QS 6252.

References

External links
 , members of the Tasmanian Symphony Orchestra

Compositions by André Jolivet
Chamber music compositions
Compositions for flute
Compositions for bassoon
Compositions for harp
1943 compositions